Council of Three may refer to:

 Rada Trzech - a collective president of the Polish Government in Exile (1939-1990)
   (1942-1945) – an underground organisation uniting most partisan units in the Protectorate of Bohemia and Moravia
 Iraqi Council of Three - a collective president of Iraq chosen after the 1958 revolution
 Sanshikan, the legislature of the Ryūkyū Kingdom

See also 
 Triumvirate